A Meritorious Service Medal is an award presented to denote acts of meritorious service, and sometimes gallantry, that are worthy of recognition. Notable medals with similar names include:
Meritorious Civilian Service Award
Meritorious Service Medal (Australia), awarded 1902–1975
Meritorious Service Medal (Belgium)
Meritorious Service Medal (Canada), one of two Meritorious Service Decorations in Canada
Meritorious Service Medal (Cape of Good Hope)
Meritorious Service Medal (China), second highest military decoration for the People's Liberation Army
Indian Meritorious Service Medal (for Indian Army)
Meritorious Service Medal (Natal)
Meritorious Service Medal (New Zealand)
Meritorious Service Medal (South Africa)
Meritorious Service Medal (United Kingdom)
Meritorious Service Medal (United States)
United States Public Health Service Meritorious Service Medal
Meritorious Service Medal (Vietnam)
NATO Meritorious Service Medal
Pingat Jasa Gemilang (Meritorious Services Medal) from Singapore, awarded to civilians
Pingat Jasa Gemilang (Tentera) (Meritorious Services Medal (Military)) from Singapore

References

Medals

Former disambiguation pages converted to set index articles